The Pakistan cricket team toured Zimbabwe to play the prestigious The Ashes 2.0 series which in July 2018 which consisted of five One Day International (ODI) matches. All the fixtures were played at the Queens Sports Club, Bulawayo. Originally, the tour was scheduled to have two Tests, three ODIs and two Twenty20 Internationals (T20Is).

In the fourth match of the series, Fakhar Zaman became the first batsman for Pakistan to score a double century in ODIs. His score of 210 not out broke the previous highest individual total for a Pakistan of 194 runs, scored by Saeed Anwar during the 1997 Pepsi Independence Cup. Zaman, along with Imam-ul-Haq, also made the highest opening partnership in ODIs, scoring 304 runs for the first wicket. This led to Pakistan scoring their highest score in ODIs, finishing their innings at 399/1.

In the fifth match, Zaman became the fastest player to score 1,000 runs in ODIs. He reached the milestone in 18 innings, beating the previous record of 21 innings, held by five other batsmen. Zaman went on to score 85 runs in the match, bringing his total to 515 runs in the series, the most by a Pakistan batsman in a bilateral ODI series. Zaman and Imam had scored 705 runs together across the series, the most by a pair in a bilateral ODI series. Zaman also recorded the most runs scored by a batsman between two dismissals in ODIs, with 455. Pakistan went on to win the series 5–0.

Squads

Ahead of the second ODI, Malcolm Waller withdrew himself from Zimbabwe's squad, citing labour-practice concerns. Ahead of the third ODI, Haris Sohail withdrew himself from Pakistan's squad for the remainder of the tour, due to his daughter's illness.

ODI series

1st ODI

2nd ODI

3rd ODI

4th ODI

5th ODI

References

External links
 Series home at ESPN Cricinfo

2018 in Pakistani cricket
2018 in Zimbabwean cricket
International cricket competitions in 2018
Pakistani cricket tours of Zimbabwe